Dico Koppers (born 31 January 1992) is a Dutch professional footballer who plays as a left back for Ajax Amateurs in the Derde Klasse.

Club career

Ajax
Koppers began his footballing career in Utrecht, playing for the local amateur side SCH'44 in the town of Harmelen as a striker, before getting recruited by Ajax to join their youth ranks. Under coach Sonny Silooy it was quickly noticed that Koppers strengths lied in defending, after which he was moved back to a more defensive position on the pitch. Currently serving as a left back for the Ajax A1 youth selection, Koppers appeared in his first match for the senior squad on 23 October 2011, in the 'Klassieker' derby against arch-rivals Feyenoord, starting in the left back position and playing the full ninety minutes in the 1–1 draw at home. On 31 January 2013, it was announced that Koppers would complete the 2012–13 season with ADO Den Haag on a six-month loan spell. While in The Hague, Koppers made 14 league appearances, helping his side to a 9th-place finish in the league table.

FC Twente
On 23 July 2013, it was announced that Koppers had transferred to FC Twente on a four-year contract for a fee of €800,000.

Willem II
On 22 June 2015, it was announced that Koppers would sign a deal with Willem II.

Career statistics

Honours

Club
Ajax
 Eredivisie: 2011–12

References

External links
 
 
 

1992 births
Living people
People from Woerden
Association football fullbacks
Dutch footballers
Netherlands under-21 international footballers
Netherlands youth international footballers
AFC Ajax players
ADO Den Haag players
FC Twente players
PEC Zwolle players
Almere City FC players
Willem II (football club) players
AFC Ajax (amateurs) players
Eredivisie players
Eerste Divisie players
Footballers from Utrecht (province)
Jong FC Twente players